Benazir is a Hindi film released in 1964, Starring Ashok Kumar, Meena Kumari, Shashi Kapoor and Tanuja. Directed by S.Khalil and music by Sachin Dev Burman.

Storyline

Benazir, a Muslim family drama, revolves around the film's key characters, Nawab, Anwar, Sahida and Benazir, among others. Nawab and Anwar are brothers who live in an upper-class neighborhood. Nawab is married and has a child. A bachelor, Anwar on seeing Sahida falls in love with her and proposes marriage to her. Although married, Nawab has an affair with Benazir, and keeps her as his mistress. The story takes a twist when Shauket, a family friend, tells Nawab that Anwar frequently sees Benazir. Nawab is furious when one day he sees Benazir in Anwar's arms. He is at a loss as to why his younger brother is seeing his mistress, when he is already in love with Sahida.

Review

Although Shashi Kapoor as Anwar and Tanuja as Sahida only make brief appearances, they have done justice to their roles as a beautiful young cheerful pair.

The music of Bimal Roy's Benazir scored by the legendary S. D. Burman is praise-worthy and a special mention should be made of the song, "Mil jaa re jaan-e-jaana".

Cast
 Ashok Kumar - Nawab
 Meena Kumari - Benazir
 Shashi Kapoor - Anwar
 Tanuja - Shahida
 Nirupa Roy - Nawab's wife
 Durga Khote		
 Asit Sen
 Tarun Bose - Shauket

Soundtrack 

The soundtrack includes the following tracks, composed by Sachin Dev Burman with lyrics penned by Shakeel Badayuni.

References

1964 films
1960s Hindi-language films
Films scored by S. D. Burman